Pamela Nimmo (born 23 August 1977) is a professional squash player who represented Scotland. She reached a career-high world ranking of World No. 14 in October 2002.

References

External links 

Scottish female squash players
Living people
1977 births
Sportspeople from Edinburgh